Social House is an American musical duo from Pittsburgh, Pennsylvania. As of 2020, the duo has released five singles and an EP.

History 
Michael "Mikey" Foster and Charles "Scootie" Anderson formed Social House in 2015 after moving to Los Angeles from Pittsburgh. They worked in the same production studio and named themselves after the WiFi network of the house in which they lived. They started out writing and producing songs for other artists, including Ariana Grande, Meghan Trainor, Jennifer Lopez, Chris Brown, Steven Malcolm and NCT 127. After their individual careers began to slow down the duo was successfully encouraged by their peers to collaborate on a new music project. In 2018, Social House was signed to a joint venture between the labels Scooter Braun, TBHits, and Interscope Records. Social House released their debut single "Magic in the Hamptons" featuring rapper Lil Yachty on June 8, 2018. Written about The Hamptons, the song has had over 300 million streams on Spotify. On September 28, 2018, their second single, entitled "Higher", was released. Social House released "Boyfriend" with Ariana Grande in August 2019.

Awards and nominations

Touring and performances 
On November 5, 2018, pop star Ariana Grande announced Social House and Normani would be joining her on Sweetener World Tour.

Discography

Extended plays

Singles

As lead artist

As featured artist

Music videos

Songwriting and production credits

Notes

Social house were guest performers at Ariana Grande's Sweetener World Tour in 2019.

References

Musical groups from Pittsburgh
American pop music groups
American musical duos
Musical groups with year of establishment missing